A human shield is the deliberate placement of non-combatants in or around combat targets to deter the enemy from attacking them.

Human shield may also refer to:
 Human shield (law)
 Human Shield (political party), a political party in Croatia
 The Human Shield, a 1991 American film

See also 
 Human chain